Below is a chronological listing of the United States senators from Delaware. U.S. senators were originally elected by the Delaware General Assembly for designated six-year terms beginning March 4. Frequently portions of the term would remain only upon a U.S. senator's death or resignation. From 1914 and the enforcement of the Seventeenth Amendment to the United States Constitution, adopted in 1913 but rejected by the General Assembly that year and not ratified until July 1, 2010, officeholders were popularly elected on the first Tuesday after November 1; starting 1935, the beginning of their term is January 3. Delaware's current U.S. senators are Democrats Tom Carper (serving since January 3, 2001) and Chris Coons (serving since November 15, 2010).

List of senators

|- style="height:2em"
! rowspan=3 | 1
| rowspan=3 align=left | George Read
| rowspan=3  | Pro-Admin.
| rowspan=3 nowrap | Mar 4, 1789 –Sep 18, 1793
| Elected in 1788.
| 1
| 
| rowspan=2 | 1
| rowspan=2 | Elected in 1788.
| rowspan=2 nowrap | Mar 4, 1789 –Mar 3, 1793
|  | Anti-Admin.
| rowspan=2 align=right | Richard Bassett
! rowspan=2 | 1

|- style="height:2em"
| rowspan=2 | Re-elected in 1790.Resigned to become Chief Justice of Delaware.
| rowspan=5 | 2
| 
|  | Pro-Admin.

|- style="height:2em"
| rowspan=3 
| rowspan=8 | 2
| rowspan=5 | Elected in 1793.Resigned.
| rowspan=5 nowrap | Mar 4, 1793 –Jan 19, 1798
| rowspan=3  | Pro-Admin.
| rowspan=5 align=right | John Vining
! rowspan=5 | 2

|- style="height:2em"
| colspan=3 | Vacant
| nowrap | Sep 18, 1793 –Feb 7, 1795
|  

|- style="height:2em"
! rowspan=7 | 2
| rowspan=7 align=left | Henry Latimer
|  | Pro-Admin.
| rowspan=7 nowrap | Feb 7, 1795 –Feb 28, 1801
| rowspan=2 | Elected in 1795 to finish Read's term.

|- style="height:2em"
| rowspan=6  | Federalist
| 
| rowspan=2  | Federalist

|- style="height:2em"
| rowspan=5 | Re-elected in 1797.Resigned.
| rowspan=7 | 3
| rowspan=4 

|- style="height:2em"
| Elected in 1798 to finish Vining's term.Died.
| nowrap | Jan 19, 1798 –Aug 11, 1798
|  | Federalist
| align=right | Joshua Clayton
! 3

|- style="height:2em"
|  
| nowrap | Aug 11, 1798 –Jan 17, 1799
| colspan=3 | Vacant

|- style="height:2em"
| Elected in 1799 to finish Clayton's term.
| rowspan=5 nowrap | Jan 17, 1799 –Nov 6, 1804
| rowspan=5  | Federalist
| rowspan=5 align=right | William H. Wells
! rowspan=5 | 4

|- style="height:2em"
| rowspan=2 
| rowspan=6 | 3
| rowspan=4 | Re-elected in 1799.Resigned.

|- style="height:2em"
! rowspan=8 | 3
| rowspan=8 align=left | Samuel White
| rowspan=8  | Federalist
| rowspan=8 nowrap | Feb 28, 1801 –Nov 4, 1809
| rowspan=2 | Appointed to finish Latimer's term.

|- style="height:2em"
| 

|- style="height:2em"
| rowspan=5 | Re-elected in 1803.
| rowspan=5 | 4
| rowspan=3 

|- style="height:2em"
|  
| nowrap | Nov 6, 1804 –Nov 13, 1804
| colspan=3 | Vacant

|- style="height:2em"
| Elected in 1804 to finish Wells's term.
| rowspan=7 nowrap | Nov 13, 1804 –Mar 3, 1813
| rowspan=7  | Federalist
| rowspan=7 align=right | James A. Bayard
! rowspan=7 | 5

|- style="height:2em"
| 
| rowspan=5 | 4
| rowspan=5 | Re-elected in 1805.

|- style="height:2em"
| 

|- style="height:2em"
| Re-elected in 1809.

Died.
| rowspan=6 | 5
| rowspan=3 

|- style="height:2em"
| colspan=3 | Vacant
| nowrap | Nov 4, 1809 –Jan 12, 1810
|  

|- style="height:2em"
! rowspan=7 | 4
| rowspan=7 align=left | Outerbridge Horsey
| rowspan=7  | Federalist
| rowspan=7 nowrap | Jan 12, 1810 –Mar 3, 1821
| rowspan=4 | Elected in 1810 to finish White's term.

|- style="height:2em"
| 
| rowspan=4 | 5
| Re-elected in 1811.Resigned.

|- style="height:2em"
| rowspan=2 
|  
| nowrap | Mar 3, 1813 –May 21, 1813
| colspan=3 | Vacant

|- style="height:2em"
| rowspan=2 | Elected in 1813 to finish Bayard's term.Retired.
| rowspan=2 nowrap | May 21, 1813 –Mar 3, 1817
| rowspan=2  | Federalist
| rowspan=2 align=right | William H. Wells
! rowspan=2 | 6

|- style="height:2em"
| rowspan=3 | Re-elected in 1815.Retired.
| rowspan=3 | 6
| 

|- style="height:2em"
| 
| rowspan=5 | 6
| rowspan=5 | Elected in 1817.Legislature failed to elect.
| rowspan=5 nowrap | Mar 4, 1817 –Mar 3, 1823
| rowspan=5  | Federalist
| rowspan=5 align=right | Nicholas Van Dyke
! rowspan=9 | 7

|- style="height:2em"
| 

|- style="height:2em"
| colspan=3 | Vacant
| nowrap | Mar 4, 1821 –Jan 23, 1822
|  
| rowspan=10 | 7
| rowspan=3 

|- style="height:2em"
! 5
| align=left | Caesar A. Rodney
|  | Democratic-Republican
| nowrap | Jan 24, 1822 –Jan 29, 1823
| Elected late to finish vacant term.Resigned to become U.S. Minister to the United Provinces of the River Plate.

|- style="height:2em"
| rowspan=3 colspan=3 | Vacant
| rowspan=3 nowrap | Jan 29, 1823 –Jan 8, 1824
| rowspan=3 |  

|- style="height:2em"
| rowspan=3 
| rowspan=8 | 7
|  
| nowrap | Mar 4, 1823 –Jan 8, 1824
| colspan=2 | Vacant

|-
| rowspan=3 | Re-elected late.Died.
| rowspan=3 nowrap | Jan 8, 1824 –May 21, 1826
| rowspan=2  | Federalist
| rowspan=3 align=right | Nicholas Van Dyke

|- style="height:2em"
! rowspan=5 | 6
| rowspan=5 align=left | Thomas Clayton
|  | Federalist
| rowspan=5 nowrap | Jan 8, 1824 –Mar 3, 1827
| rowspan=5 | Elected in 1824 to finish Rodney's term.

|- style="height:2em"
| rowspan=4  | NationalRepublican
| rowspan=4 
|  | NationalRepublican

|- style="height:2em"
|  
| nowrap | May 21, 1826 –Nov 8, 1826
| colspan=3 | Vacant

|- style="height:2em"
| Appointed to continue Van Dyke's term.Retired.
| nowrap | Nov 8, 1826 –Jan 12, 1827
|  | NationalRepublican
| align=right | Daniel Rodney
! 8

|- style="height:2em"
| rowspan=2 | Elected in 1827 to finish Van Dyke's term.Retired.
| rowspan=2 nowrap | Jan 12, 1827 –Mar 3, 1829
| rowspan=2  | Jacksonian
| rowspan=2 align=right | Henry M. Ridgely
! rowspan=2 | 9

|- style="height:2em"
! rowspan=2 | 7
| rowspan=2 align=left | Louis McLane
| rowspan=2  | Jacksonian
| rowspan=2 nowrap | Mar 4, 1827 –Apr 16, 1829
| rowspan=2 | Elected in 1827.Resigned to become U.S. Envoy Extraordinary and Minister Plenipotentiary to England.
| rowspan=5 | 8
| 

|- style="height:2em"
| rowspan=3 
| rowspan=5 | 8
| rowspan=5 | Elected in 1829.
| rowspan=7 nowrap | Mar 4, 1829 –Dec 29, 1836
| rowspan=7  | NationalRepublican
| rowspan=7 align=right | John M. Clayton
! rowspan=7 | 10

|- style="height:2em"
| colspan=3 | Vacant
| nowrap | Apr 16, 1829 –Jan 7, 1830
|  

|- style="height:2em"
! rowspan=4 | 8
| rowspan=4 align=left | Arnold Naudain
| rowspan=4  | NationalRepublican
| rowspan=4 nowrap | Jan 7, 1830 –Jun 16, 1836
| rowspan=2 | Elected in 1830 to finish McLane's term.

|- style="height:2em"
| 

|- style="height:2em"
| rowspan=2 | Re-elected in 1832.Resigned.
| rowspan=6 | 9
| 

|- style="height:2em"
| rowspan=4 
| rowspan=8 | 9
| rowspan=2 | Re-elected in 1835.Resigned.

|- style="height:2em"
! rowspan=9 | 9
| rowspan=5 align=left | Richard H. Bayard
| rowspan=3  | NationalRepublican
| rowspan=5 nowrap | Jun 17, 1836 –Sep 19, 1839
| rowspan=4 | Elected in 1836 to finish Naudain's term.

|- style="height:2em"
|  
| nowrap | Dec 29, 1836 –Jan 9, 1837
| colspan=3 | Vacant

|- style="height:2em"
| rowspan=5 | Elected in 1837 to finish his cousin's term.
| rowspan=8 nowrap | Jan 9, 1837 –Mar 3, 1847
|  | NationalRepublican
| rowspan=8 align=right | Thomas Clayton
! rowspan=8 | 11

|- style="height:2em"
| rowspan=2  | Whig
| 
| rowspan=7  | Whig

|- style="height:2em"
| Re-elected during the 1838/39 cycle.Resigned to become Chief Justice of Delaware.
| rowspan=5 | 10
| rowspan=3 

|- style="height:2em"
| colspan=2 | Vacant
| nowrap | Sep 19, 1839 –Jan 11, 1841
|  

|- style="height:2em"
| rowspan=3 align=left | Richard H. Bayard
| rowspan=3  | Whig
| rowspan=3 nowrap | Jan 12, 1841 –Mar 3, 1845
| rowspan=3 | Elected in 1841 to finish his own term.Retired.

|- style="height:2em"
| 
| rowspan=3 | 10
| rowspan=3 | Re-elected in 1841.

|- style="height:2em"
| 

|- style="height:2em"
! rowspan=2 | 10
| rowspan=2 align=left | John M. Clayton
| rowspan=2  | Whig
| rowspan=2 nowrap | Mar 4, 1845 –Feb 23, 1849
| rowspan=2 | Elected in 1845.Resigned to become U.S. Secretary of State.
| rowspan=4 | 11
| 

|- style="height:2em"
| rowspan=2 
| rowspan=4 | 11
| rowspan=4 | Elected in 1846 or 1847.Retired.
| rowspan=4 nowrap | Mar 4, 1847 –Mar 3, 1853
| rowspan=4  | Whig
| rowspan=4 align=right | Presley Spruance
! rowspan=4 | 12

|- style="height:2em"
! rowspan=2 | 11
| rowspan=2 align=left | John Wales
| rowspan=2  | Whig
| rowspan=2 nowrap | Feb 23, 1849 –Mar 3, 1851
| rowspan=2 | Elected in 1849 to finish Clayton's term.Lost re-election.

|- style="height:2em"
| 

|- style="height:2em"
! rowspan=10 | 12
| rowspan=10 align=left | James A. Bayard Jr.
| rowspan=10  | Democratic
| rowspan=10 nowrap | Mar 4, 1851 –Jan 29, 1864
| rowspan=6 | Elected in 1851.
| rowspan=6 | 12
| 

|- style="height:2em"
| 
| rowspan=6 | 12
| rowspan=2 | Elected in 1853.Died.
| rowspan=2 nowrap | Mar 4, 1853 –Nov 9, 1856
| rowspan=2  | Whig
| rowspan=2 align=right | John M. Clayton
! rowspan=2 | 13

|- style="height:2em"
| rowspan=4 

|- style="height:2em"
|  
| nowrap | Nov 9, 1856 –Nov 19, 1856
| colspan=3 | Vacant

|- style="height:2em"
| Appointed to continue Clayton's term.Declined nomination to finish Clayton's term.
| nowrap | Nov 19, 1856 –Jan 14, 1857
|  | Whig
| align=right | Joseph P. Comegys
! 14

|- style="height:2em"
| rowspan=2 | Elected in 1857 to finish Clayton's term.Lost re-election.
| rowspan=2 nowrap | Jan 14, 1857 –Mar 3, 1859
| rowspan=2  | Democratic
| rowspan=2 align=right | Martin W. Bates
! rowspan=2 | 15

|- style="height:2em"
| rowspan=3 | Re-elected in 1857.
| rowspan=3 | 13
| 

|- style="height:2em"
| 
| rowspan=4 | 13
| rowspan=4 | Elected in 1858.
| rowspan=9 nowrap | Mar 4, 1859 –Mar 3, 1871
| rowspan=9  | Democratic
| rowspan=9 align=right | Willard Saulsbury Sr.
! rowspan=9 | 16

|- style="height:2em"
| 

|- style="height:2em"
| Re-elected in 1863.Resigned.
| rowspan=6 | 14
| rowspan=2 

|- style="height:2em"
! rowspan=3 | 13
| rowspan=3 align=left | George R. Riddle
| rowspan=3  | Democratic
| rowspan=3 nowrap | Jan 29, 1864 –Mar 29, 1867
| rowspan=3 | Elected in 1864 to finish Bayard's term.Died.

|- style="height:2em"
| 
| rowspan=5 | 14
| rowspan=5 | Re-elected in 1864.Lost re-election.

|- style="height:2em"
| rowspan=3 

|- style="height:2em"
| colspan=3 | Vacant
| nowrap | Mar 29, 1867 –Apr 5, 1867
|  

|- style="height:2em"
! 14
| align=left | James A. Bayard Jr.
|  | Democratic
| nowrap | Apr 5, 1867 –Mar 3, 1869
| Appointed to continue Riddle's term.Elected in 1869 to finish Riddle's term.Retired.

|- style="height:2em"
! rowspan=9 | 15
| rowspan=9 align=left | Thomas F. Bayard
| rowspan=9  | Democratic
| rowspan=9 nowrap | Mar 4, 1869 –Mar 6, 1885
| rowspan=3 | Elected in 1869.
| rowspan=3 | 15
| 

|- style="height:2em"
| 
| rowspan=3 | 15
| rowspan=3 | Elected in 1870.
| rowspan=11 nowrap | Mar 4, 1871 –Mar 3, 1889
| rowspan=11  | Democratic
| rowspan=11 align=right | Eli M. Saulsbury
! rowspan=11 | 17

|- style="height:2em"
| 

|- style="height:2em"
| rowspan=3 | Re-elected in 1875.
| rowspan=3 | 16
| 

|- style="height:2em"
| 
| rowspan=3 | 16
| rowspan=3 | Re-elected in 1876.

|- style="height:2em"
| 

|- style="height:2em"
| rowspan=3 | Re-elected in 1881.Resigned to become U.S. Secretary of State.
| rowspan=5 | 17
| 

|- style="height:2em"
| 
| rowspan=5 | 17
| rowspan=5 | Re-elected in 1883.Lost re-election.

|- style="height:2em"
| rowspan=3 

|- style="height:2em"
| colspan=3 | Vacant
| nowrap | Mar 6, 1885 –Mar 18, 1885
|  

|- style="height:2em"
! rowspan=8 | 16
| rowspan=8 align=left | George Gray
| rowspan=8  | Democratic
| rowspan=8 nowrap | Mar 18, 1885 –Mar 3, 1899
| Elected in 1885 to finish Bayard's term.

|- style="height:2em"
| rowspan=3 | Re-elected in 1887.
| rowspan=3 | 18
| 

|- style="height:2em"
| 
| rowspan=3 | 18
| rowspan=3 | Election year unknown.Lost re-election.
| rowspan=3 nowrap | Mar 4, 1889 –Mar 3, 1895
| rowspan=3  | Republican
| rowspan=3 align=right | Anthony Higgins
! rowspan=3 | 18

|- style="height:2em"
| 

|- style="height:2em"
| rowspan=4 | Re-elected in 1893.Lost re-election.
| rowspan=4 | 19
| 

|- style="height:2em"
| rowspan=2 
| rowspan=4 | 19
| Legislature failed to elect.
| nowrap | Mar 4, 1895 –Jan 19, 1897
| colspan=3 | Vacant

|- style="height:2em"
| rowspan=3 | Elected in 1897 to finish vacant term.Lost re-election.
| rowspan=3 nowrap | Jan 19, 1897 –Mar 3, 1901
| rowspan=3  | Democratic
| rowspan=3 align=right | Richard R. Kenney
! rowspan=3 | 19

|- style="height:2em"
| 

|- style="height:2em"
| rowspan=2 colspan=3 | Vacant
| rowspan=2 nowrap | Mar 4, 1899 –Mar 1, 1903
| rowspan=2 | Legislature failed to elect.
| rowspan=4 | 20
| 

|- style="height:2em"
| rowspan=2 
| rowspan=5 | 20
| Legislature failed to elect.
| nowrap | Mar 4, 1901 –Mar 2, 1903
| colspan=3 | Vacant

|- style="height:2em"
! rowspan=2 | 17
| rowspan=2 align=left | L. Heisler Ball
| rowspan=2  | Republican
| rowspan=2 nowrap | Mar 2, 1903 –Mar 3, 1905
| rowspan=2 | Elected in 1903 to finish vacant term.
| rowspan=4 | Elected in 1903 to finish vacant term.Retired.
| rowspan=4 nowrap | Mar 2, 1903 –Mar 3, 1907
| rowspan=4  | Republican
| rowspan=4 align=right | J. Frank Allee
! rowspan=4 | 20

|- style="height:2em"
| 

|- style="height:2em"
| colspan=3 | Vacant
| nowrap | Mar 4, 1905 –Jun 12, 1906
| Legislature failed to elect.
| rowspan=4 | 21
| rowspan=2 

|- style="height:2em"
! rowspan=6 | 18
| rowspan=6 align=left | Henry A. du Pont
| rowspan=6  | Republican
| rowspan=6 nowrap | Jun 13, 1906 –Mar 3, 1917
| rowspan=3 | Elected in 1906 to finish vacant term.

|- style="height:2em"
| 
| rowspan=3 | 21
| rowspan=3 | Elected in 1907.Retired.
| rowspan=3 nowrap | Mar 4, 1907 –Mar 3, 1913
| rowspan=3  | Republican
| rowspan=3 align=right | Harry A. Richardson
! rowspan=3 | 21

|- style="height:2em"
| 

|- style="height:2em"
| rowspan=3 | Re-elected in 1911.Lost re-election.
| rowspan=3 | 22
| 

|- style="height:2em"
| 
| rowspan=3 | 22
| rowspan=3 | Elected in 1913.Lost re-election.
| rowspan=3 nowrap | Mar 4, 1913 –Mar 3, 1919
| rowspan=3  | Democratic
| rowspan=3 align=right | Willard Saulsbury Jr.
! rowspan=3 | 22

|- style="height:2em"
| 

|- style="height:2em"
! rowspan=3 | 19
| rowspan=3 align=left | Josiah O. Wolcott
| rowspan=3  | Democratic
| rowspan=3 nowrap | Mar 4, 1917 –Jul 2, 1921
| rowspan=3 | Elected in 1916.Resigned to become Chancellor of Delaware.
| rowspan=5 | 23
| 

|- style="height:2em"
| 
| rowspan=5 | 23
| rowspan=5 | Elected in 1918.Lost renomination.
| rowspan=5 nowrap | Mar 4, 1919 –Mar 3, 1925
| rowspan=5  | Republican
| rowspan=5 align=right | L. Heisler Ball
! rowspan=5 | 23

|- style="height:2em"
| rowspan=3 

|- style="height:2em"
! 20
| align=left | T. Coleman du Pont
|  | Republican
| nowrap | Jul 7, 1921 –Nov 6, 1922
| Appointed to finish Wolcott's term.Lost election to finish Wolcott's term.

|- style="height:2em"
! rowspan=6 | 21
| rowspan=6 align=left | Thomas F. Bayard Jr.
| rowspan=6  | Democratic
| rowspan=6 nowrap | Nov 7, 1922 –Mar 3, 1929
| Elected in 1922 to finish Wolcott's term.

|- style="height:2em"
| rowspan=5 | Elected in 1922.Lost re-election.
| rowspan=5 | 24
| 

|- style="height:2em"
| 
| rowspan=5 | 24
| rowspan=2 | Elected in 1924.Resigned.
| rowspan=2 nowrap | Mar 4, 1925 –Dec 8, 1928
| rowspan=2  | Republican
| rowspan=2 align=right | T. Coleman du Pont
! rowspan=2 | 24

|- style="height:2em"
| rowspan=3 

|- style="height:2em"
|  
| nowrap | Dec 8, 1928 –Dec 10, 1928
| colspan=3 | Vacant

|- style="height:2em"
| rowspan=2 | Appointed to finish du Pont's term.Elected in 1930 to finish du Pont's term.
| rowspan=5 nowrap | Dec 10, 1928 –Jan 3, 1937
| rowspan=5  | Republican
| rowspan=5 align=right | Daniel O. Hastings
! rowspan=5 | 25

|- style="height:2em"
! rowspan=6 | 22
| rowspan=6 align=left | John G. Townsend Jr.
| rowspan=6  | Republican
| rowspan=6 nowrap | Mar 4, 1929 –Jan 3, 1941
| rowspan=3 | Elected in 1928.
| rowspan=3 | 25
| 

|- style="height:2em"
| 
| rowspan=3 | 25
| rowspan=3 | Elected in 1930.Lost re-election.

|- style="height:2em"
| 

|- style="height:2em"
| rowspan=3 | Re-elected in 1934.Lost re-election.
| rowspan=3 | 26
| 

|- style="height:2em"
| 
| rowspan=3 | 26
| rowspan=3 | Elected in 1936.Lost renomination.
| rowspan=3 nowrap | Jan 3, 1937 –Jan 3, 1943
| rowspan=3  | Democratic
| rowspan=3 align=right | James H. Hughes
! rowspan=3 | 26

|- style="height:2em"
| 

|- style="height:2em"
! rowspan=3 | 23
| rowspan=3 align=left | James M. Tunnell
| rowspan=3  | Democratic
| rowspan=3 nowrap | Jan 3, 1941 –Jan 3, 1947
| rowspan=3 | Elected in 1940.Lost re-election.
| rowspan=3 | 27
| 

|- style="height:2em"
| 
| rowspan=3 | 27
| rowspan=3 | Elected in 1942.Lost re-election.
| nowrap rowspan=3 | Jan 3, 1943 –Jan 3, 1949
| rowspan=3  | Republican
| rowspan=3 align=right | C. Douglass Buck
! rowspan=3 | 27

|- style="height:2em"
| 

|- style="height:2em"
! rowspan=12 | 24
| rowspan=12 align=left | John J. Williams
| rowspan=12  | Republican
| rowspan=12 nowrap | Jan 3, 1947 –Dec 31, 1970
| rowspan=3 | Elected in 1946.
| rowspan=3 | 28
| 

|- style="height:2em"
| 
| rowspan=3 | 28
| rowspan=3 | Elected in 1948.
| rowspan=6 nowrap | Jan 3, 1949 –Jan 3, 1961
| rowspan=6  | Democratic
| rowspan=6 align=right | J. Allen Frear Jr.
! rowspan=6 | 28

|- style="height:2em"
| 

|- style="height:2em"
| rowspan=3 | Re-elected in 1952.
| rowspan=3 | 29
| 

|- style="height:2em"
| 
| rowspan=3 | 29
| rowspan=3 | Re-elected in 1954.Lost re-election.

|- style="height:2em"
| 

|- style="height:2em"
| rowspan=3 | Re-elected in 1958.
| rowspan=3 | 30
| 

|- style="height:2em"
| 
| rowspan=3 | 30
| rowspan=3 | Elected in 1960.
| rowspan=7 nowrap | Jan 3, 1961 –Jan 3, 1973
| rowspan=7  | Republican
| rowspan=7 align=right | J. Caleb Boggs
! rowspan=7 | 29

|- style="height:2em"
| 

|- style="height:2em"
| rowspan=3 | Re-elected in 1964.Retired and resigned to give his successor preferential seniority.
| rowspan=4 | 31
| 

|- style="height:2em"
| 
| rowspan=4 | 31
| rowspan=4 | Re-elected in 1966.Lost re-election.

|- style="height:2em"
| rowspan=2 

|- style="height:2em"
! rowspan=16 | 25
| rowspan=16 align=left | William Roth
| rowspan=16  | Republican
| rowspan=16 nowrap | Jan 1, 1971 –Jan 3, 2001
| Appointed to finish Williams's term, having been elected to the next term.

|- style="height:2em"
| rowspan=3 | Elected in 1970.
| rowspan=3 | 32
| 

|- style="height:2em"
| 
| rowspan=3 | 32
| rowspan=3 | Elected in 1972.
| rowspan=19 nowrap | Jan 3, 1973 –Jan 15, 2009
| rowspan=19  | Democratic
| rowspan=19 align=right | Joe Biden
! rowspan=19 | 30

|- style="height:2em"
| 

|- style="height:2em"
| rowspan=3 | Re-elected in 1976.
| rowspan=3 | 33
| 

|- style="height:2em"
| 
| rowspan=3 | 33
| rowspan=3 | Re-elected in 1978.

|- style="height:2em"
| 

|- style="height:2em"
| rowspan=3 | Re-elected in 1982.
| rowspan=3 | 34
| 

|- style="height:2em"
| 
| rowspan=3 | 34
| rowspan=3 | Re-elected in 1984.

|- style="height:2em"
| 

|- style="height:2em"
| rowspan=3 | Re-elected in 1988.
| rowspan=3 | 35
| 

|- style="height:2em"
| 
| rowspan=3 | 35
| rowspan=3 | Re-elected in 1990.

|- style="height:2em"
| 

|- style="height:2em"
| rowspan=3 | Re-elected in 1994.Lost re-election.
| rowspan=3 | 36
| 

|- style="height:2em"
| 
| rowspan=3 | 36
| rowspan=3 | Re-elected in 1996.

|- style="height:2em"
| 

|- style="height:2em"
! rowspan=14 | 26
| rowspan=14 align=left | Tom Carper
| rowspan=14  | Democratic
| rowspan=14 nowrap | Jan 3, 2001 –Present
| rowspan=3 | Elected in 2000.
| rowspan=3 | 37
| 

|- style="height:2em"
| 
| rowspan=3 | 37
| rowspan=3 | Re-elected in 2002.

|- style="height:2em"
| 

|- style="height:2em"
| rowspan=5 | Re-elected in 2006.
| rowspan=5 | 38
| 

|- style="height:2em"
| rowspan=3 
| rowspan=5 | 38
| Re-elected in 2008.Resigned to become U.S. Vice President.

|- style="height:2em"
| Appointed to continue Biden's term.Retired when his successor was elected.
| nowrap|Jan 15, 2009 –Nov 15, 2010
|  | Democratic
| align=right | Ted Kaufman
! 31

|- style="height:2em"
| rowspan=3 | Elected in 2010 to finish Biden's term.
| rowspan=9 nowrap | Nov 15, 2010 –Present
| rowspan=9  | Democratic
| rowspan=9 align=right | Chris Coons
! rowspan=9 | 32

|- style="height:2em"
| 

|- style="height:2em"
| rowspan=3 | Re-elected in 2012.
| rowspan=3 | 39
| 

|- style="height:2em"
| 
| rowspan=3 | 39
| rowspan=3 | Re-elected in 2014.

|- style="height:2em"
| 

|- style="height:2em"
| rowspan=3 | Re-elected in 2018.
| rowspan=3 | 40
| 

|- style="height:2em"
| 
| rowspan=3 | 40
| rowspan=3 | Re-elected in 2020.

|- style="height:2em"
| 

|- style="height:2em"
| rowspan=2 colspan=5 | To be determined in the 2024 election.
| rowspan=2|41
| 

|- style="height:2em"
| 
| 41
| colspan=5 | To be determined in the 2026 election.

See also

 List of United States representatives from Delaware
 List of United States Senate elections in Delaware
 United States congressional delegations from Delaware

References

External links
 Members of Congress from Delaware, govtrack.us
 U.S. Senate members from Delaware, civil.services

 
United States Senators
Delaware